The 1996 Summer Olympics, officially known as the Games of the XXVI Olympiad, were a summer multi-sport event held in Atlanta, Georgia, United States from 19 July to 4 August 1996. A total of 10,318 athletes from 197 National Olympic Committees (NOCs), competed in 271 events in 26 sports.

Athletes from 79 NOCs won at least one medal. The United States won the most gold medals (44), as well as the most medals overall (101) for the first time since 1984, and for the first time since 1968 in a non-boycotted Summer Olympics. Donovan Bailey of Canada set a world record in the men's 100m race (9.84 seconds). Michael Johnson of the United States set a world record in the 200m race (19.32 seconds) and Naim Suleymanoglu of Turkey set the record of an unprecedented three consecutive Olympic titles in weightlifting.

Armenia, Azerbaijan, Belarus, the Czech Republic, Georgia, Kazakhstan, Kyrgyzstan, Moldova, Slovakia, Tajikistan, Turkmenistan, Ukraine and Uzbekistan were represented for the first time at a Summer Games. Czech Republic and Slovakia had competed previously as Czechoslovakia, and the other nations were formerly part of the Soviet Union. Of these, only Kyrgyzstan, Tajikistan, and Turkmenistan did not receive any medals.

This Olympics also marked Hong Kong's final appearance as a British colony, before its handover to China, during which it also won its first ever medal, a gold in sailing; this was the only medal Hong Kong ever won while under British rule.

Medal table

The medal table is based on information provided by the International Olympic Committee (IOC) and is consistent with IOC convention in its published medal tables. By default, the table is ordered by the number of gold medals won by a NOC. The number of silver medals is taken into consideration next and then the number of bronze medals. If nations are still tied, equal ranking is given and they are listed alphabetically by IOC country code. Medals won in team competitions are counted only once, no matter how many athletes won medals as part of the team.

Key

See also
 1996 Summer Olympics
 International Olympic Committee
 1996 Summer Paralympics medal table

References

External links
 
 
 

Medal table
Summer Olympics medal tables